{{Infobox person
| name = Hermann J. Gaul
| image =  
| image_size = 
| caption = 
| birth_date = 1869
| birth_place = Cologne, Germany
| death_date = 1949
| death_place = Chicago, Illinois, United States
| other_names = 
| nationality = Germany, USA
| known_for = Hermann J. Gaul,  Architect}} Hermann J. Gaul''' (1869–1949) was an American architect of German descent, who designed a number of Catholic churches, schools, convents and rectories in Missouri, Illinois, Indiana, and elsewhere.

Personal life
Born in Cologne, Germany in 1869 Gaul came to the U.S. at the turn of the 20th century. He settled in Chicago, Illinois and, after apprenticing for a time with noted Chicago architect Louis Sullivan, established an architectural firm under his own name in 1902. During his long and distinguished career he designed many landmark buildings for Roman Catholic clients throughout the Midwest.

Gaul’s son Michael F. Gaul (1913-1996)  joined his father’s firm, now known as Hermann J. Gaul and Son, in the early 1930s and carried on the practice after his father’s retirement in 1948.

Several of Gaul’s buildings have been placed on the U.S. National Register of Historic Places.

Works include
 St. John the Baptist Church, Hammond, Indiana
 St. Benedict Church, Chicago, Illinois
 St. Mary Church and Academy, Indianapolis, Indiana
 Holy Hill National Shrine of Mary, Help of Christians, Hubertus, Wisconsin
 Angel Guardian Orphanage, (now Misericordia North), Chicago, Illinois
 St. Michael Church, Old Town, Chicago, Illinois (extensive exterior remodeling of original 1873 church, carried out in 1913)
 St. Peter and Paul Church, Naperville, Illinois
 St Nicholas Church, Evanston, Illinois
 Notre Dame Roman Catholic Convent,  Waterdown, Ontario. Canada
 Greystone Mansion, Logan Square, Chicago, Illinois
 Former Mallinckrodt College, Wilmette, Illinois
 St. Philomena Church, Chicago, Illinois
 Immaculate Conception Church (now Monastery of the Holy Cross) Bridgeport, Chicago, Illinois
 Divine Word Monastery, Chapel of the Holy Spirit, Techny, Illinois
 St. Joseph School, Wilmette, Illinois
 St. Mary Church, Decatur, Indiana
 St. Margaret, Lake Henry, Minnesota

References

.

American ecclesiastical architects
Architects of Roman Catholic churches
Architects from Illinois
German emigrants to the United States
1869 births
1949 deaths